Paul Revere Williams, FAIA (February 18, 1894 – January 23, 1980) was an American architect based in Los Angeles, California. He practiced mostly in Southern California and designed the homes of numerous celebrities, including Frank Sinatra, Lucille Ball and Desi Arnaz, Lon Chaney, Barbara Stanwyck and Charles Correll. He also designed many public and private buildings.

Early life and education
Williams came from a family of middle class Memphis residents: Chester Stanley and Lila Wright Williams. They migrated to Los Angeles in 1893 with their son, Chester, to start a fruit business, but were not successful. Paul was born in Los Angeles on February 18, 1894. His father died in 1896 from tuberculosis and his mother two years later from the same illness, leaving the boys in foster care. He  was eventually adopted by C.I. Clarkson and his wife. Williams was the only African-American student in his elementary school. He studied at the Los Angeles School of Art and Design and at the Los Angeles branch of the New York Beaux-Arts Institute of Design Atelier, subsequently working as a landscape architect with Wilbur Cook, Jr. He studied architectural engineering from 1916 to 1919 at the University of Southern California, where he earned his degree, designing several residential buildings while a student there. Williams became a certified architect in California in 1921 and the first certified African-American architect west of the Mississippi.

He married Della Mae Givens on June 27, 1917, at the First AME Church in Los Angeles. They had three children: Paul Revere Williams Jr. (born and died June 30, 1925, buried in Evergreen Cemetery, Los Angeles); Marilyn Frances Williams (born December 25, 1926) and Norma Lucille Williams Harvey (born September 18, 1928).

Career

Williams won an architectural competition at age 25, and three years later opened his own office. Known as an outstanding draftsman, he perfected the skill of rendering drawings "upside down." This skill was developed because in the 1920s many of his white clients felt uncomfortable sitting directly next to a Black man. He learned to draft upside down so that he could sit across the desk from his clients who would see his drafts right-side-up.

Struggling to gain attention, he served on the first Los Angeles City Planning Commission in 1920.

From 1921 through 1924, Williams worked for Los Angeles architect John C. Austin, eventually becoming chief draftsman, before establishing his own office.

In 1923, Williams became the first African-American member of the American Institute of Architects (AIA).

In 1939, he won the AIA Award of Merit for his design of the MCA Building in Beverly Hills (now headquarters of the Paradigm Talent Agency).

At one point in his career Williams became interested in prefabricated structures. He worked together with Wallace Neff to design experimental Airform structures which were small homes that only took a few days to construct using simple materials.

A. Quincy Jones (1913–79) was an architect who is claimed to have hired Williams and later collaborated with him on projects in Palm Springs, including the Palm Springs Tennis Club (1947) and the Town & Country (1948) and Romanoff's on the Rocks (1948) restaurants.

Lockheed and Guerdon Industries recruited Williams to design a concept for a car-alternative travel system in Las Vegas. He developed the idea of a monorail-like system called the Skylift Magi-Cab that would bring people to and from McCarran Airport and the city center.

During World War II, Williams worked for the Navy Department as an architect.

During his career Williams designed over 2,000 buildings.

Awards, recognition and honors

During his lifetime
In 1948 the anthology radio drama Destination Freedom recapped his earlier life.

In 1951, Williams won the Omega Psi Phi fraternity, Man of the Year award and in 1953 he received the Spingarn Medal from the NAACP for his outstanding contributions as an architect and member of the African-American community.

Williams also received honorary doctorates from Lincoln University of Missouri (doctor of science, 1941), Howard University (doctor of architecture, 1952), and the Tuskegee Institute (doctor of fine arts, 1956).

In 1956, he won an award for service, from Wisdom magazine, for "contributions to knowledge and distinguished service to mankind."

In 1957, he became the first Black member to be inducted into the AIA's College of Fellows. An April 2, 1957 letter from the Executive Secretary of AIA, offered Williams the honor of Fellowship and membership in the College of Fellows "for your notable contribution in Public Service."

Posthumous honors
USC listed him among its distinguished alumni in the television commercial for the school shown during its football games in 2004.

The American Institute of Architects (AIA) gave him its gold medal in 2017, 37 years after Williams's death.

Publications
Book: The Small Home of Tomorrow (1945), with a successor volume New Homes for Today (1946).

Essay: "I Am a Negro," American Magazine (1937). Reprinted in Ebony Magazine (1986)  The following is a quote from that essay:I came to realize that I was being condemned, not by a lack of ability, but by my color. I passed through successive stages of bewilderment, inarticulate protest, resentment, and, finally, reconciliation to the status of my race. Eventually, however, as I grew older and thought more clearly, I found in my condition an incentive to personal accomplishment, an inspiring challenge. Without having the wish to "show them," I developed a fierce desire to "show myself." I wanted to vindicate every ability I had. I wanted to acquire new abilities. I wanted to prove that I, as an individual, deserved a place in the world.

Works

Private homes

Williams designed more than 2,000 private homes, most of which were in the Hollywood Hills and the Mid-Wilshire portion of Los Angeles (including his own home in Lafayette Square), part of historic West Adams, Los Angeles. He also designed at least one home in the San Rafael district along with many others in Pasadena and La Cañada Flintridge. The Linda Vista Area of Pasadena has many Spanish Colonial and French Country homes of his design including many commissioned by business magnates (Chrysler Corporation) and actors.

His most famous homes were for celebrities, and he was well regarded for his mastery of various architectural styles. Modern interpretations of Tudor-revival, French Chateau, Regency, French Country, and Mediterranean architecture were all within his vernacular. One notable home, the Jay Paley House, which he designed for Jay Paley in Holmby Hills, and later the residence of Barron Hilton, was used as the 'Colby mansion' in exterior scenes for The Colbys television series. Williams's client list included Frank Sinatra (the notorious pushbutton house), Bill "Bojangles" Robinson, Lon Chaney, Sr., Lucille Ball, Julie London, Tyrone Power (two houses), Barbara Stanwyck, Bert Lahr, Charles Correll, Will Hays, Zasu Pitts, and Danny Thomas.

In contrast to these splendid mansions, Williams co-designed with Hilyard Robinson the first federally funded public housing projects of the post-war period (Langston Terrace in Washington, D.C.) and later the Pueblo del Rio project in southeast Los Angeles.

Williams famously remarked upon the bitter irony of the fact that most of the homes he designed, and whose construction he oversaw, were on parcels whose deeds included segregation covenants barring Black people from purchasing them.

A number of his works are listed on the National Register of Historic Places.

Works

(In Los Angeles, unless otherwise noted)
 28th Street YMCA, 1006 E. 28th St., Los Angeles (Williams, Paul R.), NRHP-listed
 421 La Fayette Park Place, Los Angeles, CA
 Angeles Mesa Elementary School, Los Angeles, California
 Angelus Funeral Home, 1010 E. Jefferson Blvd., Los Angeles (Williams, Paul R.), NRHP-listed
 Arrowhead Springs Hotel & Spa, San Bernardino, California;
 Beverly Hills Hotel (redesigned & added rooms in the 1940s)
 Baldwin Hills Mall (original anchor stores).
 Carver Park Homes, Nevada
 Cord Estate (late 1930s) for E.L. Cord of Cord/Auburn/Dusenberg Motorcars (Beverly Hills, California)
 First A.M.E Church
 First Church of Christ, Scientist, 501 Riverside Dr., Reno, NV (Williams, Paul Revere), NRHP-listed
 Founder's Church of Religious Science (1960), 3281 W. 6th Street – mid-century modern in Mid-Wilshire District of Los Angeles
 Luella Garvey House (1934), 589–599 California Ave., Reno, NV (William, Paul Revere)
 Golden State Mutual Life Insurance Building
 Goldschmidt House, 243 Avenida La Cuesta, San Clemente, CA (Williams, Paul R.), NRHP-listed
 Guardian Angel Cathedral, Las Vegas, Nevada
 Hilltop Farm house (1934), 4400 E. Post Rd SE; Cedar Rapids, IA
 Hollywood YMCA
 Hotel Nutibara, Medellin, Colombia, the city's first grand hotel inaugurated in 1945
 Jay Paley House (1935), 1060 Brooklawn Drive, Holmby Hills
 Kelly Music Co. Building (1929, as of 2020, Tanino restaurant), 1043 Westwood Bl., Westwood Village
 The La Concha Motel, Nevada
 The concrete paraboloid La Concha Motel in Las Vegas (disassembled and moved to the Neon Museum in Las Vegas, Nevada, for use as the museum lobby 2006)
 Kenneth Hahn Hall of Administration (Stanton, Stockwell, Williams and Wilson)
 Marina Del Rey Middle School
 Stanley Mosk Courthouse used by the California Superior Court of Los Angeles County (Stanton, Stockwell, Williams and Wilson)
 Nickerson Gardens
 Palm Springs, CA, Tennis Club
 Perino's restaurant at 4101 Wilshire Boulevard. Williams managed the interior and exterior redesign in 1950, then oversaw a second renovation after the restaurant was badly damaged by a fire in 1954.
 Pueblo del Rio Housing Project, Los Angeles, 1941
 Roberts House Ranch "The Tropical Terrace", Malibu, CA (The remains of the burned down structures can be explored on Solstice Canyon Trail in Santa Monica Mountains National Recreation Area.)
 Saks Fifth Avenue, Beverly Hills, 9600 Wilshire Bd, Los Angeles (with Parkinson & Parkinson)
 Seaview Palos Verdes, a mid-century modern tract neighborhood built from 1959 to 1960
 Second Baptist Church, 1100 E. 24th St., Los Angeles (Williams, Paul R.), NRHP-listed
 Shrine Auditorium (Williams helped prepare construction drawings as a young architect.)
 The retro-futuristic googie styled Theme Building at Los Angeles International Airport (LAX). (In the 1960s as part of the Pereira & Luckman firm and with consulting engineers, Williams helped design this futuristic landmark.)
 The Gatehouse (1940), for aviation pioneer Thomas F. Hamilton (Lake Arrowhead, California);
 UCLA Botany Building
 Woodrow Wilson High School
 One or more works in 27th Street Historic District, along 27th St., Los Angeles (Williams, Paul), NRHP-listed
 One or more works in Berkley Square, area bounded by Byrnes Ave., D St., Leonard Ave., and G St., Las Vegas, NV (Williams, Paul R.)
 501 World Way, first parking structure at LAX, built in 1965

He also designed the Al Jolson tomb in Hillside Memorial Park, to where Jolson's body was moved in 1951. The tomb and fountain are prominently visible from the adjacent San Diego Freeway. It is perhaps a fitting tribute to both Williams and Jolson that he was chosen to design Jolson's resting place since Jolson had a long history of supporting African-American entertainers, in a time when that was controversial.

Professional records

In 1955, Williams was hired to transform a W.W.Woolworth store at the corner of Broadway and 45th in Los Angeles into the Broadway Federal Savings and Loan. When the bank opened, Williams safeguarded much of his business papers in the bank.  During the fires that consumed the area after the Rodney King trial in 1992, the Broadway Bank burned and it was feared that much of Williams' archives had been lost. Williams family had carefully curated the documents and Williams' granddaughter, Karen Elyse Hudson,  agreed to the acquisition of the archive by the Getty Research Institute and the USC School of Architecture. In June 2020, Milton Curry of USC announced the contents of the archive: about 35,000 architectural plans, 10,000 original drawings, blueprints, photographs, and correspondence that help "fill the gaps of Los Angeles Modernism in the 20th century."

Death

Williams retired his practice in 1973, and died from diabetes on January 23, 1980, at age 85. His funeral was held at the First AME Church he designed, and the presiding minister, Cecil Murray, was joined in the pulpit by Dr. William H.D. Hornaday, the Senior Minister of Founder's Church of Religious Science, that Williams also had designed. Dr. Hornaday described Williams as a gentle and courtly man of the highest integrity. Williams was interred in the Sanctuary of Radiance, Manchester Garden Mausoleum at Inglewood Park Cemetery, Inglewood. Williams's widow Della Williams (1895–1996) co-founded (with Fannie Williams) 'The Wilfandel Club' Established November 21, 1945, by black women active in the Los Angeles, California, community. The Wilfandel Club's goal has been to promote civic betterment, philanthropic endeavors, and general culture. The Wilfandel Club is the oldest African-American women's club in Los Angeles. Club meetings are still held at the beautiful Wilfandel Club House on 3425 West Adams Blvd in Los Angeles. Della Williams survived her famous husband by 16 years, living to the age of 100; she died on July 24, 1996. Her funeral was held at Founder's Church of Religious Science, designed by her husband. She was interred in the Williams crypt Inglewood Park Cemetery, Inglewood.

On October 29, 2015 a monument and memorial plaza to Paul Williams was dedicated just to the north of the Golden State Mutual Life Insurance Building as part of its recent renovation.  The monument, made by artist Georgia Toliver features a 9-foot-tall bas relief of Paul Williams with many of his significant works. The bas relief is flanked with interpretive panels with a biography of Mr. Williams as well as a history of the Golden State Mutual Life Insurance Company.

Quotes
"If I allow the fact that I am a Negro to checkmate my will to do, now, I will inevitably form the habit of being defeated."

"Planning is thinking beforehand how something is to be made or done, and mixing imagination with the product – which in a broad sense makes all of us planners. The only difference is that some people get a license to get paid for thinking and the rest of us just contribute our good thoughts to our fellow man."

"Without having the wish to 'show them,' I developed a fierce desire to 'show myself,'" Williams wrote in his 1937 essay entitled "I am a Negro" for The American Magazine. "I wanted to vindicate every ability I had. I wanted to acquire new abilities. I wanted to prove that I, as an individual, deserved a place in the world."

"Expensive homes are my business and social housing is my hobby."

"Being a Californian was to my advantage. In California the people are interested in ideas that are new and fresh without the traditional or historical ties that are ordinarily more associated with East Coast thinking."

Legacy
 Williams is featured on the documentary series Profiles of African-American Success.
 In coordination with the Hollywood Studio District Neighborhood Council and Paul Williams Place Committee an effort is being made to rename the historic North Saint Andrews Place in Los Angeles after this icon in architecture.
 Hollywood Style is a book by Karen Hudson (Williams's granddaughter) about his houses.
 The 99% Invisible podcast "The Architect of Hollywood" looks into Williams' life and influence
 The documentary Hollywood's Architect: The Paul R. Williams Story aired on PBS in February 2020.
 A collection of 280 photographs was published in 2020 by Janna Ireland featuring Williams' work, called Regarding Paul R. Williams: A Photographer's View.

Notes

References
  
  
 Sennot, Stephen, Samudio, Jeffrey B.(contributing editor), "Encyclopedia of 20th Century Architecture: Paul Revere Williams", Routledge, Taylor & Francis Publishers, January, 2004, 1,500 word biography of life and professional work
 Yenser, Thomas (editor), Who's Who in Colored America: A Biographical Dictionary of Notable Living Persons of African Descent in America, Who's Who in Colored America, Brooklyn, New York, 1930–1931–1932 (Third Edition)
 Hewitt, Mark Alan, "Williams, Paul R.," in Joan Marter, Editor, Grove Encyclopedia of American Art (New York: Oxford Univ. Press: 2011); online edition.
 Getty, USC acquire vital archives,  Files of Paul Williams Los Angeles Times

External links

  Hollywood's Architect: The Paul R. Williams Story
 USC Trojan biographical page
 1928 Paul Williams Renovation Photos, James V. Coane & Associates Architects
 Paul Revere Williams Project Website
 

 
African-American architects
20th-century American architects
Architects from Los Angeles
Mediterranean Revival architects
1894 births
1980 deaths
Fellows of the American Institute of Architects
People from South Los Angeles
Burials at Inglewood Park Cemetery
USC Viterbi School of Engineering alumni
Spingarn Medal winners
USC School of Architecture alumni
Beaux-Arts Institute of Design (New York City) alumni
Burials at Evergreen Cemetery, Los Angeles
Recipients of the AIA Gold Medal